Mayday is an emergency procedure word used internationally as a distress signal in voice-procedure radio communications.

It is used to signal a life-threatening emergency primarily by aviators and mariners, but in some countries local organizations such as firefighters,  police forces, and transportation organizations also use the term. Convention requires the word be repeated three times in a row during the initial emergency declaration ("Mayday mayday mayday") to prevent it being mistaken for some similar-sounding phrase under noisy conditions, and to distinguish an actual mayday call from a message about a mayday call.

History
The "mayday" procedure word was conceived as a distress call in the early 1920s by Frederick Stanley Mockford, officer-in-charge of radio at Croydon Airport, England. He had been asked to think of a word that would indicate distress and would easily be understood by all pilots and ground staff in an emergency. The term is unrelated to the holiday May Day.

Following tests, the new procedure word was introduced for cross-Channel flights in February 1923. The previous distress call had been the Morse code signal SOS, but this was not considered suitable for voice communication, "[o]wing to the difficulty of distinguishing the letter 'S' by telephone". In 1927, the International Radiotelegraph Convention of Washington adopted the voice call "mayday" as the radiotelephone distress call in addition to the SOS radiotelegraph (Morse code) signal.

Mayday calls

If a mayday call cannot be sent because a radio is not available, a variety of other distress signals and calls for help can be used. Additionally, a mayday call can be sent on behalf of one vessel by another; this is known as a mayday relay.

Civilian aircraft making a mayday call in United States airspace are encouraged by the Federal Aviation Administration to use the following format, omitting any portions as necessary for expediency or where they are irrelevant (capitalization as in the original source):

Making a false distress call is a criminal offence in many countries, punishable by a fine, restitution, and possible imprisonment.

Other urgent calls

Pan-pan

"Pan-pan" (from the French: , 'a breakdown') indicates an urgent situation, such as a mechanical failure or a medical problem, of a lower order than a "grave and imminent threat requiring immediate assistance". The suffix "medico" originally was to be added by vessels in British waters to indicate a medical problem ("pan-pan medico", repeated three times), or by aircraft declaring a non-life-threatening medical emergency of a passenger in flight, or those operating as protected medical transport in accordance with the Geneva Conventions. "Pan-pan medico" is no longer in official use.

Declaring emergency
Sometimes the phrase "declaring emergency" is used in aviation, as an alternative to calling "mayday". For example, in 1998 Swissair Flight 111 radioed "Swissair one-eleven heavy is declaring emergency" after their situation had worsened, upgrading from the "pan-pan" which was declared earlier.

However, the International Civil Aviation Organization recommends the use of the standard "pan-pan" and "mayday" calls instead of "declaring an emergency".  Cases of pilots using phrases other than "pan-pan" and "mayday" have caused confusion and errors in aircraft handling.

Silencing other communications traffic

"Seelonce mayday" (using an approximation of the French pronunciation of ) is a demand that the channel only be used by the vessel/s and authorities involved with the distress. The channel may not be used for normal working traffic until "seelonce feenee" is broadcast. "Seelonce mayday" and "seelonce feenee" may only be sent by the controlling station in charge of the distress. The expression "stop transmitting – mayday" is an aeronautical equivalent of "seelonce mayday". "Seelonce distress" and "prudonce" are no longer in use since ITU WRC-07.

The format for a "seelonce mayday" is MAYDAY, All Stations x3 or [Interfering station] x3, this is [controlling station], SEELONCE MAYDAY. ITU RR 2016.

"Seelonce feenee" (from French , 'silence finished') means that the emergency situation has been concluded and the channel may now be used normally. "Distress traffic ended" is the aeronautical equivalent of "seelonce feenee".

The format for the "seelonce feenee" is MAYDAY, All stations x3, this is [controlling station] x3, date and time in UTC, distressed vessels MMSI number, distressed vessels name, distressed vessels call sign, SEELONCE FEENEE. ITU RR 2016.

See also
 Aircraft emergency frequency
 CQD
 Distress signal
 Global Maritime Distress Safety System
 Pan-pan
 Sécurité
 SOS
 Vessel emergency codes

References

External links
 Handling Distress and Help Calls
 ACP135(F): Communications Instructions: Distress and Rescue Procedures
 Boating Safety: A VHF Primer, the use and misuse of the VHF
 
 Transport Canada: Radio Distress Procedures Card TP9878

Emergency communication
History of air traffic control
International telecommunications
Rescue
Distress signals
Telecommunications-related introductions in 1923